Mukawa is a town in the Samburu County, of Kenya. Mukawa has a population around 16,281. Mukawa is in the Rift Valley Province. Mukawa is 360 km west of Nairobi. Mukawa has an elevation of 2232 meters (2.232 km).

References 

Populated places in Rift Valley Province
Populated places in Samburu County